Wayne Moss (born February 9, 1938 in Charleston, West Virginia, United States) is an American guitar player, bassist, record producer and songwriter best known for his session work in Nashville. Moss was one of the founders of Area Code 615 and Barefoot Jerry, both bands made up of Nashville session players. In 1960 or 1961, Moss founded Cinderella Sound recording studio.  In 2011 it was Nashville's oldest surviving independent studio.

His session work includes playing with:

 Joan Baez
 Charlie Daniels
 Fats Domino 
 Bob Dylan 
 Everly Brothers
 Lefty Frizzell
 Waylon Jennings
 Leo Kottke
 Kris Kristofferson
 Brenda Lee (as a member of her touring band)
 Dennis Linde
 Charlie McCoy
 Moon Mullican
 Mike Nesmith
 Roy Orbison
 Dolly Parton
 Carl Perkins
 Charley Pride
 Linda Ronstadt
 Nancy Sinatra
 Steve Miller Band

Selected discography
 Blonde On Blonde, Bob Dylan,  1966 (notably guitar on  "I Want You" and bass on "Rainy Day Women #12 & 35"
 Roy Orbison, "Pretty Woman"
 Stan Beaver, "I Got a Rocket in my Pocket"
Tommy Roe,  "Sheila"
 Joe Simon, "The Chokin' Kind", #13 and "Yours Love"
With Kai Winding
Modern Country (Verve, 1964)

References

External links
Wayne Moss Interview NAMM Oral History Library (2017)

1938 births
Living people
Musicians from Charleston, West Virginia
Musicians from Nashville, Tennessee
Record producers from West Virginia
Record producers from Tennessee
American session musicians
Country musicians from West Virginia
Writers from Charleston, West Virginia
Country musicians from Tennessee